This is a list of the premiers of China from 1911–1912 during the Qing dynasty, 1912 onwards of the Republic of China and 1949 onwards of the People's Republic of China.

The first recorded instance of a monarch of China appointing a chief minister was in around 1130 BC, by King Tang of the Shang dynasty. Since then, almost every monarch in China appointed a chief minister to help him or her to run the administration. This role has been known by several different names, most commonly Chancellor. With the unification of China under the First Emperor of the Qin dynasty in 221 BC, the power in the premiers' hands was reduced because of the Emperors' intentions of setting up an absolute monarchy. In 1380, the Hongwu Emperor of the Ming dynasty ordered the death of his Chancellor, and did not appoint another in his lifetime. From then until 1911, a number of people formally shared the responsibility of chief minister to the Emperor. Even when one of them dominated government, such as in the case of Li Hongzhang, they were nevertheless formally just one of several ministers of equal status. During much of the Qing dynasty, for example, the traditional role of the Chancellor was performed collectively by the Grand Council.

In mid 1911, the modern position of Premier was created, when the Qing Imperial Government created the "Princes' Cabinet" as a reform of Chinese politics, shortly before it was overthrown. When Yuan Shikai took over the premiership, the premiers of China played an influential role in Chinese politics.

The list below shows premiers of China during the Qing dynasty. Multiple terms in office, consecutive or otherwise, are listed. The first column shows the consecutively numbered term of the premier, while the second column shows his or her chronological position amongst individual premiers.

For the modern-day positions referred to as Premiers of China, see:
 List of premiers of the Republic of China (Presidents of Executive Yuan) – since 1912
 List of premiers of the People's Republic of China (Premiers of State Council) – since 1949

List of prime ministers of Qing Imperial Government (1911–12)
The Qing Imperial Government created the "Imperial Family Cabinet" in May 1911, in order to appease popular anger and calls for reform. But the formation of Cabinet brought even more disaffection. Soon the Wuchang Uprising forced the Qing government to abolish the cabinet, and instead summon Yuan Shikai to head the government. The imperial government collapsed soon afterward.

Zhang Xun briefly held the post during his brief attempt to restore the Qing dynasty in July 1917.

Prime Ministers of Qing Imperial Government
 period: 8 May 1911 – 10 March 1912

List of premiers of the ROC (since 1912) 

 Premiers of Cabinet of the Republic of China
 period: 13 March 1912 – 1 May 1914

Secretaries of State of the Empire of China
 period: 22 December 1915 – 22 March 1916

Secretaries of State of the Republic of China
 period: 1 May 1914 – 22 December 1915; 22 March 1916 – 29 June 1916

Premiers of State Council of the Republic of China
 period: 29 June 1916 – 1 July 1917

Premiers of State Council of the Republic of China
 period: 14 July 1917 – 24 November 1924

Premiers of State Council of the Republic of China
 period: 24 November 1924 – 2 June 1928

Presidents of Executive Yuan of the Republic of China
 period: 25 October 1928 – 24 May 1948

Presidents of Executive Yuan of the Republic of China
 period: 24 May 1948 – present

List of premiers of the PRC (since 1949) 

The premiership of PRC was created since the establishment of the People's Republic of China on 1 October 1949.

 Generations of leadership

See also
 Grand chancellor (China)
 List of Chinese leaders
 Paramount leader

References
 China Online Encyclopedia

 
Premiers
Premiers
Premiers

fr:Premiers ministres de la République populaire de Chine